Filey Lifeboat Station is a Royal National Lifeboat Institution (RNLI) lifeboat station located in the town of Filey, North Yorkshire, England. It is one of nine operational RNLI lifeboat stations situated on the Yorkshire Coast.

Filey's first lifeboat was stationed in the town in 1804 and it became an RNLI asset in 1852. Filey is home to two lifeboats; the Marjorie Shepherd, an Atlantic 85-class and the Braund, a D-class.

History
A lifeboat station was first established at Filey in 1804. The station was taken over by the RNLI in 1852 and they erected a new lifeboathouse. In 1890, the third lifeboathouse to built in Filey was opened.

In the late spring of 1860, a hurricane hit Filey and destroyed all the boats and nets of the local fishermen. As the damaged items belonged mostly to the men who manned the lifeboat, an appeal was made in The Times to aid in the support of the fishermen's loss of livelihood. One of the letters written to the paper was by a local resident doctor who noted that the Filey Lifeboat [up until that point] had saved more lives at sea than any other station belonging to the RNLI in England.

In 1966, when the first D-Class Inshore Lifeboats (ILB) were being introduced, D-86 was sent to Filey and operated from a separate lifeboathouse to the All-Weather Lifeboat (ALB). In 1991, the main lifeboathouse was rebuilt again (on the same site as the 1890 lifeboathouse) so that it could accommodate both a large All-Weather Lifeboat (ALB) and an Inshore Lifeboat (ILB) together.

The station's Mersey-class ALB was replaced with a fast response Atlantic 85-class ILB in 2021.

Notable incidents

24 September 1935 – a trawler named Skegness ran aground just by the cliffs at Speeton. Initially the captain of the vessel said that all was fine and he would await the high tide to re-float the ship. But unfortunately, before high tide arrived, the weather deteriorated. Within an hour, the wind had strengthened to gale force from the east and was driving the sea to the shore. At 11:10 pm, the skipper of the Skegness was calling for help and the Filey Lifeboat was launched. Due to the swell, they couldn't get near, so the  Lifeboat was launched, but they were given the wrong location and headed for Filey Brigg. The  Lifeboat was also launched, but just like the Filey Lifeboat, she couldn't get near enough. The lights on the ship were observed going out at 1:30 am the following morning. In all, eleven sailors died, some of their bodies washed up onto the shore in the days after the tragedy, but most were never found.

23 June 1974 – the motor mechanic on the station collapsed and died during a launch.

Fleet

References

Sources

External links

Launching of Hollon the Second from a horse drawn slipway 1900

Filey
Lifeboat stations in Yorkshire
Buildings and structures in North Yorkshire